Fred Otis Holmes Amey (born December 4, 1981) is a former professional American and Canadian football wide receiver. He was signed by the San Francisco 49ers as an undrafted free agent in 2005. He played college football at Sacramento State University.

Amey also played for the Austin Wranglers, Atlanta Falcons, Cleveland Gladiators, BC Lions, Winnipeg Blue Bombers, San Jose SaberCats and Sacramento Mountain Lions.

Early years
Amey attended James Logan High School in Union City, California and lettered in football and track. As a senior, in football, he was an All-Mission Valley Athletic League selection and helped lead his team to the League championship.

College career
Amey attended Sacramento State University, where he was a two-time All-American and the school's most productive receiver each of his four years. Between 2001 - 2004, Amey led the team in all-purpose yards, kick returns, receiving yards and punt returns. He finished his college career with 248 receptions, 4,049 receiving yards and 27 touchdowns.

Amey left Sacramento State holding all of the Hornets' major receiving and return records including: career receptions (248), career receiving TDs (27), season receptions (76), receptions in a single-game (15), career kickoff return yards (1,687), career punt return for touchdown (90 yards) and most punt returns in a season (33).

Professional career

San Francisco 49ers
After going undrafted in the 2005 NFL Draft, the San Francisco 49ers signed Amey on April 27, 2005. Prior to the season opener he changed his first name from Fred to Otis. He made the team out of training camp, and in his first regular season game against the St. Louis Rams on September 11, he returned a punt 75 yards for a touchdown. He played in 11 games over the course of the season, averaging 17.2 yards per kick return an 11.4 yards per punt return. He recorded no receptions and also fumbled once on a punt return. He was released by the 49ers on September 2, 2006.

Austin Wranglers
In early 2007, Amey signed with the Austin Wranglers of the Arena Football League. He went on to appear in all 16 regular season games for the Wranglers that season, totaling 1,738 all-purpose yards. He finished third on the team in receptions with 88 and was second on the team in both receiving yards (1,036) and touchdowns (18). Amey also carried the ball 25 times for 54 yards and returned 36 kicks for 630 yards.

Atlanta Falcons
On August 12, 2007, Amey signed with the Atlanta Falcons. He appeared in two preseason games, recording two receptions for 23 yards. However, he failed to make the team and was waived on September 1. He spent the rest of the year out of football.

Cleveland Gladiators
After not being able to land with an NFL team in 2007, Amey re-joined the AFL with the Cleveland Gladiators. On April 19, 2008, Amey recorded a career-high 15 receptions for 208 yards and six touchdowns in an 83-69 victory against the Los Angeles Avengers. He also helped lead the Gladiators to a deep playoff run, reaching the AFL National Conference Championship Game in 2008. Amey led the Arena Football League with 50 touchdowns in the 2008 season.

BC Lions
Amey was signed by the BC Lions on May 13, 2009, and was released at the end of training camp on June 24, 2009.

Winnipeg Blue Bombers
On August 17, 2009, the Blue Bombers signed Amey to the practice roster after learning their top receiver, Terrence Edwards, was questionable to play the next game with a turf toe injury. On September 26, 2009 Otis appeared in his first CFL game against the Toronto Argonauts. In this game, he had 6 catches for 118 yards. Amey played in five regular season games for the Blue Bombers in 2009, recording 188 yards on 13 catches. He also recorded three tackles on special teams. In June 2010, the Blue Bombers released Amey.

Career statistics

Personal
His brother Vince Amey was a defensive tackle at Arizona State and played for the Oakland Raiders in 1998. He also played for the Los Angeles Avengers and Arizona Rattlers of the Arena Football League between 2001 and 2007.

References

External links
 BC Lions bio
 Cleveland Gladiators bio
 Stats at ArenaFan

1981 births
African-American players of Canadian football
American football return specialists
American football wide receivers
American players of Canadian football
Atlanta Falcons players
Austin Wranglers players
BC Lions players
Canadian football wide receivers
Cleveland Gladiators players
Living people
People from Union City, California
Sacramento Mountain Lions players
Sacramento State Hornets football players
San Francisco 49ers players
Winnipeg Blue Bombers players
San Jose SaberCats players
Sportspeople from Alameda County, California
Players of American football from California
21st-century African-American sportspeople
20th-century African-American people
Players of Canadian football from California